Stob Garbh is a mountain in the Scottish Highlands. It is a Munro top located in the Breadalbane area of Loch Lomond and the Trossachs National Park.

Munros
Mountains and hills of Highland (council area)